The European Bronze Age is characterized by bronze artifacts and the use of bronze implements. The regional Bronze Age succeeds the Neolithic and Copper Age and is followed by the Iron Age. It starts with the Aegean Bronze Age in 3200 BC
(succeeded by the Beaker culture), and spans the entire 2nd millennium BC (Unetice culture, Tumulus culture, Nordic Bronze Age, Terramare culture, Urnfield culture and Lusatian culture) in Northern Europe, lasting until c. 600 BC.

History

Aegean

The Aegean Bronze Age begins around 3200 BC
when civilizations first established a far-ranging trade network.  This network imported tin and charcoal to Cyprus, where copper was mined and alloyed with the tin to produce bronze. Bronze objects were then exported far and wide and supported the trade. Isotopic analysis of the tin in some Mediterranean bronze objects indicates it came from as far away as Great Britain.

Knowledge of navigation was well developed at this time and reached a peak of skill not exceeded until a method was discovered (or perhaps rediscovered) to determine longitude around AD 1750.

The eruption of Thera, which according to archaeological data occurred approximately 1500 BC, resulted in the decline of the Minoan. This turn of events gave the opportunity to the Mycenaeans to spread their influence throughout the Aegean. Around c. 1450 BC, they were in control of Crete itself and colonized several other Aegean islands, reaching as far as Rhodes. The Mycenaean Greeks introduced several innovations in the fields of engineering, architecture and military infrastructure, while trade over vast areas of the Mediterranean was essential for the Mycenaean economy. Their syllabic script, the Linear B, offers the first written records of the Greek language and their religion already included several deities that can be also found in the Olympic Pantheon. Mycenaean Greece was dominated by a warrior elite society and consisted of a network of palace states that developed rigid hierarchical, political, social and economic systems. At the head of this society was the king, known as wanax.

Balkans 

A study in the journal Antiquity from 2013 reported the discovery of a tin bronze foil from the Pločnik archaeological site dated to c. 4650 BC, as well as 14 other artefacts from Serbia and Bulgaria dated to before 4000 BC, showed that early tin bronze was more common than previously thought and developed independently in Europe 1,500 years before the first tin bronze alloys in the Near East. The production of complex tin bronzes lasted for c. 500 years in the Balkans. The authors reported that evidence for the production of such complex bronzes disappears at the end of the 5th millennium coinciding with the "collapse of large cultural complexes in north-eastern Bulgaria and Thrace in the late fifth millennium BC". Tin bronzes using cassiterite tin would be reintroduced to the area again some 1,500 years later.

Caucasus

The Maykop culture was the major early Bronze Age culture in the North Caucasus. Some scholars date arsenical bronze artifacts in the region as far back as the mid-4th millennium BC.

Eastern Europe 

The Yamnaya culture was a late copper age/early Bronze Age culture dating to the 36th–23rd centuries BC. The culture was predominantly nomadic, with some agriculture practiced near rivers and a few hill-forts.

The Catacomb culture, covering several related archaeological cultures, was first to introduce corded pottery decorations into the steppes and showed a profuse use of the polished battle ax, providing a link to the West. Parallels with the Afanasevo culture, including provoked cranial deformations, provide a link to the East. It was preceded by the Yamnaya culture and succeeded by the western Corded Ware culture. The eastern Corded Ware culture (Fatyanovo-Balanovo culture) gave rise to the Abashevo culture, followed by the Sintashta culture, where the earliest known spoked-wheel chariots have been found, dating from c. 2000 BC. The Catacomb culture in the Pontic steppe was succeeded by the Multi-cordoned Ware culture, and the  Srubnaya culture from c. the 17th century BC.

Central Europe 

Important sites include:
 Biskupin (Poland)
 Nebra (Germany)
 Zug-Sumpf, Zug, Switzerland
 Vráble, Slovakia

In Central Europe, the early Bronze Age Unetice culture (2300–1600 BC) includes numerous smaller groups like the Straubingen, Adlerberg and Hatvan cultures. Some very rich burials, such as the one located at Leubingen (today part of Sömmerda) with grave gifts crafted from gold, point to an increase of social stratification already present in the Unetice culture. All in all, cemeteries of this period are rare and of small size. The Unetice culture is followed by the middle Bronze Age (1600–1200 BC) Tumulus culture, which is characterized by inhumation burials in tumuli (barrows). In the eastern Hungarian Körös tributaries, the early Bronze Age first saw the introduction of the Makó culture, followed by the Otomani and Gyulavarsánd cultures.

The late Bronze Age Urnfield culture (1300–750 BC) is characterized by cremation burials. It includes the Lusatian culture in eastern Germany and Poland (1300–500 BC) that continues into the Iron Age. The Central European Bronze Age is followed by the Iron Age Hallstatt culture (800–450 BC).

Italy

The Italian Bronze Age is conditionally divided  into four periods: The Early Bronze Age (2300–1700 BC), the Middle Bronze Age (1700–1350 BC), the Recent Bronze Age (1350–1150 BC), the Final Bronze Age  (1150–950 BC).

During the second millennium BC, the Nuragic civilization flourished in the island of Sardinia. It was a rather homogeneous culture, more than 7000 imposing stone tower-buildings known as Nuraghe were built by this culture all over the island, along with other types of monuments such as the megaron temples, the monumental Giants' graves and the holy well temples. Sanctuaries and larger settlements were also built starting from the late second millennium BC to host these religious structures along with other structures such ritual pools, fountains and tanks, large stone roundhouses with circular benches used for the meeting of the leaders of the chiefdoms and large public areas. Bronze tools and weapons were widespread and their quality increased thanks to the contacts between the Nuragic people and Eastern Mediterranean peoples such as the Cypriots, the lost waxing technique was introduced to create several hundred bronze statuettes and other tools. The Nuragic civilization survived throughout the early Iron Age when the sanctuaries were still in use, stone statues were crafted and some Nuraghi were reused as temples.

Northern Europe

In northern Germany, Denmark, Sweden and Norway, Bronze Age cultures manufactured many distinctive and artistic artifacts. This includes lur horns, horned ceremonial helmets, sun discs, gold jewelry and some unexplained finds like the bronze "gong" from Balkåkra in Sweden. Some linguists believe that an early Indo-European language was introduced to the area probably around 2000 BC, which eventually became Proto-Germanic, the last common ancestor of the Germanic languages. This would fit with the apparently unbroken evolution of the Nordic Bronze Age into the most probably ethnolinguistically Germanic Pre-Roman Iron Age.

The age is divided into the periods I–VI, according to Oscar Montelius. Period Montelius V, already belongs to the Iron Age in other regions.

British Isles

In Great Britain, the Bronze Age is considered to have been the period from around 2100 to 700 BC. Immigration brought new people to the islands from the continent. Recent tooth enamel isotope research on bodies found in early Bronze Age graves around Stonehenge indicate that at least some of the immigrants came from the area of modern Switzerland. The Beaker people displayed different behaviors from the earlier Neolithic people and cultural change was significant. The rich Wessex culture developed in southern Britain at this time. Additionally, the climate was deteriorating; where once the weather was warm and dry it became much wetter as the Bronze Age continued, forcing the population away from easily defended sites in the hills and into the fertile valleys. Large livestock ranches developed in the lowlands which appear to have contributed to economic growth and inspired increasing forest clearances. The Deverel–Rimbury culture began to emerge in the second half of the 'Middle Bronze Age' (c. 1400–1100 BC) to exploit these conditions. Cornwall was a major source of tin for much of western Europe and copper was extracted from sites such as the Great Orme mine in northern Wales.  Social groups appear to have been tribal but with growing complexity and hierarchies becoming apparent. 
 
Also, the burial of dead (which until this period had usually been communal) became more individual. For example, whereas in the Neolithic a large chambered cairn or long barrow was used to house the dead, the 'Early Bronze Age' saw people buried in individual barrows (also commonly known and marked on modern British Ordnance Survey maps as Tumuli), or sometimes in cists covered with cairns.

The greatest quantities of bronze objects found in England were discovered in East Cambridgeshire, where the most important finds were done in Isleham (more than 6500 pieces).

Atlantic Europe

The Atlantic Bronze Age is a cultural complex of the Bronze Age period of approximately 1300–700 BC that includes different cultures in Portugal, Andalusia, Galicia, France, Britain, and Ireland and is marked by economic and cultural exchange that led to the high degree of cultural similarity exhibited by coastal communities, including the frequent use of stones as chevaux-de-frise, the establishment of cliff castles, or the domestic architecture sometimes characterized by the round houses. Commercial contacts extended from Sweden and Denmark to the Mediterranean. The period was defined by a number of distinct regional centres of metal production, unified by a regular maritime exchange of some of their products. The major centres were southern England and Ireland, north-western France, and western Iberia.

The Bronze Age in Ireland commenced in the centuries around 2000 BC when copper was alloyed with tin and used to manufacture Ballybeg type flat axes and associated metalwork. The preceding period is known as the Copper Age and is characterised by the production of flat axes, daggers, halberds and awls in copper. The period is divided into three phases: Early Bronze Age 2000–1500 BC; Middle Bronze Age 1500–1200 BC and Late Bronze Age 1200–c. 500 BC. Ireland is also known for a relatively large number of Early Bronze Age Burials.

See also
Chariot burial
Megalithic tomb
Old European hydronymy
Helladic period
Nordic Bronze Age
Argaric culture
Atlantic Bronze Age

Notes

References

External links